Lisa Brambani (born 18 August 1967) is a female English retired racing cyclist.

Cycling career
Brambani was part of the Great Britain team in the 1988 Summer Olympics and won a silver medal for England at the 1990 Commonwealth Games. She won the British National Road Race Championships on four occasions.

She represented England and won a silver medal in the road race, at the 1990 Commonwealth Games in Auckland, New Zealand.

Personal life
Her daughter Abby-Mae Parkinson has also represented Great Britain in road cycling.

References

1967 births
Living people
English female cyclists
Olympic cyclists of Great Britain
Cyclists at the 1988 Summer Olympics
Commonwealth Games silver medallists for England
Cyclists at the 1990 Commonwealth Games
Sportspeople from Bradford
Commonwealth Games medallists in cycling
Medallists at the 1990 Commonwealth Games